Raden Rara Nike Ratnadilla (27 December 1975 – 19 March 1995), better known as Nike Ardilla, was an Indonesian singer, actress, model, and philanthropist of Sundanese descent. Usually referred to as the Lady Rocker and the Queen of Rock by the Indonesian media, Ardilla was instrumental in the return of teen pop rock to the country's music scene and had a dominant presence during the first half of the 1990s. At the height of her career and fame in 1995, she was involved in a traffic incident that took her life at the age of 19. Her death prompted an outpouring of nationwide grief. The media regularly refers to the fact that she is the only musician in the country whose death continues to be mourned even after more than 25 years, and hailed by many as one of the most successful figures in Indonesia's entertainment industry.

Ardilla has sold more than 30 million albums to date, making her the best-selling Indonesian artist in history and her 1990 album Bintang Kehidupan which has sold over 6 million copies in Southeast Asia, holds the title of being the best-selling Indonesian album of all time.

Early life
Raden Rara Nike Ratnadilla was born on 27 December, 1975 in Bandung, West Java, the youngest child of three siblings of Raden Edi Kusnadi (1940–1997) and Nining Ningsihrat (1937–2022). She had Dutch and German ancestry from her maternal grandmother, who was descended from the Geesdorf family. Her father worked for the Indonesian Railway Company (PT Kereta Api Indonesia), which caused the family to move periodically throughout her childhood. They eventually settled in Bandung, where she began performing in talent shows at the age of five, winning a local singing competition in 1980.

Career
Denny Sabri, a talent scout, helped Ardilla sign a record deal with Arista Records. In 1987, she contributed to a compilation album titled Bandung Rock Power, which featured Nicky Astria, Mel Shandy, and among others. When Ardilla was 13, she released her debut album, Seberkas Sinar in 1989, which she managed to finish recording within a day. It reached number one in the charts, and sold over 1 million copies within a year. The title track stayed at the top of the charts for ten weeks, and the album had further hits with the top-ten ballad "Cinta Pertama" and the top-five song "Tembang Asmara." In the spring of 1990, Ardilla released her second album, Bintang Kehidupan, with a chart-topping title track. The album itself also topped the charts on its debut, selling over 500,000 copies in its first week and setting a new record for single-week sales by a female artist. By 1991, Bintang Kehidupan had sold over two million copies and won two BASF Awards, for Best New Artist and Best Selling Album. She performed the title track at the 1991 Asia Song Festival in Shanghai where she won the "Gold Prize of New Singer."

Her next album Nyalakan Api was released in the autumn of 1990, which earned her a third BASF Award, again for Best Selling Album. Her fourth album, Matahariku was released in the summer of 1991 and was followed in the spring of 1992 by Biarlah Aku Mengalah, which was featured on Musik Plus. After winning Best Selling Album consecutively at the 1993 BASF Awards, Ardilla released the greatest hits album, Tinggallah Ku Sendiri (The Best Of). It spawned the hit single "Tinggallah Kusendiri". She moved from Billboard Records (now EMI) to Musica Studios for her record Biarkan Cintamu Berlalu, which debuted at number one and earned her the 1994 HDX Best Selling Album award. Her final album, Sandiwara Cinta, was released on 1 March, 1995. The single first began airing on the radio in late February. The first version of the Sandiwara Cinta video debuted on TV in late February 1995. A second version of the video was released posthumously in April 1995, featuring Ardilla in the style of her idol Marilyn Monroe. Sandiwara Cinta won HDX Awards for Best Selling Album, Best Single (Deru Debu), and Best Video Klip MTV Indonesia.

In addition to singing, Ardilla was also active as an actress and model. In 1986, she joined the cast of the film Kasmaran, starring Ida Iasha and Slamet Rahardjo, in which she played the daughter of Iasha's character. In 1988, she starred in one of the best-selling regional film series, Si Kabayan for which she recorded a single for the soundtrack of the film. In 1990, Nike starred as the main character in the movie Ricky Nakalnya Anak Muda with actor Ryan Hidayat which became a box office hit. Nike continued to produce successful films throughout the period of the late 80s to early 90s. She was also successful in several soap operas, including NONE, one of the highly rated soap operas directed by Putu Wijaya. In 1990, Ardilla won a modelling competition Gadis Sampul and a "Best Model Catwalk" award in the "LA Model Contest" in Bandung two years prior.

Death and legacy

On the night of 18 March 1995, Ardilla met with friends from Aneka-Yess!, a popular teenage magazine, at the Jayakarta Hotel Bandung, to discuss the election of the magazine's cover girl and cover boy. The vote was to be held the following day, with her appearing as a guest star at the event. She spent the early hours of the next day with friends and later left a hotel at 05:15 AM to go home with her female companion and bodyguard, Atun Sofiatun. While attempting to overtake another car, she lost control of her Honda Civic Genio and slammed it into a wall in a suburban Bandung street, killing her instantly. Sofiatun, severely injured, was taken to a hospital where she recovered, though with little recollection of the crash. Ardilla was buried on the same day (per Islamic funeral customs) in Ciamis, West Java, in the presence of family, friends, fans, reporters as well as tens of thousands of mourners.

Two months after her death, a commemorative concert was held in Bandung with performances from some of Indonesia's best-known artists, proceeds from which went into the establishment of a charity, the Nike Ardilla Foundation. Some international media outlets reported her passing, such as Hong Kong Asiaweek and the US Billboard. In 1996, Pos Indonesia published commemorative postcards and envelopes, which were sold out within days. In the same year, daily Bandung newspaper Pikiran Rakyat reported the Nike Ardilla stamps issued in Abkhazia and Tuva, Russia. Her posthumous releases, such as albums Mama Aku Ingin Pulang (1995) and Suara Hatiku (1996), were met with success. In 2013, JK released her early unreleased material, Hanya Satu Nama, originally recorded in 1988 under the name "Nike Astrina." Ardilla appeared as a cover in the 370th edition of NOVA tabloid, which was originally published in March 1995, managed to sell over 900,000 copies and remains the all-time best selling tabloid edition.  

A quarter of a century after her death, her untimely departure has been said to have left an "eternal sorrow" throughout the country. She remains both a legend and a phenomenon in the Indonesian music scene today. Every year, thousands of fans commemorate her passing by visiting her grave and the Nike Ardilla Museum, which was constructed in her memory. Fan clubs dedicated to her are still running with active members. Wendi Putranto, a music observer, described Ardilla as "one in a million", a female version of Elvis Presley with a "cult status" in Indonesian pop culture. He further described her death as being similar to that of a president, and the national TV airing the news of her passing for an extended period of time.

George Quinn, the Dean of the Asian Studies Faculty of the Australian National University, Canberra, conducted research in 2007 on the Javanese pilgrimage. He compared the people who made pilgrimages to Ardila's grave to those who often make pilgrimages and pray at the tombs of saints (such as the Wali Sanga), and mentioned Ardilla as the only pop culture figure who has achieved such an honour.

Before she died, she had expressed her desire to leave the entertainment world because she wanted to deepen her religious knowledge at Pesantren Cipasung, Tasikmalaya on 11 April 1995.

Personal life
Melly Goeslaw, one of Ardilla's closest friends, described her as 'a person with high morals' and 'a very humble and kind person', who had the habits of bringing home numerous gifts after returning from abroad. They have known each other since childhood due to being neighbours. Ardilla is also one of the figures who helped Goeslaw build her musical career.  

In 1993, Ardilla funded the construction of a special school in Bandung for the deaf and mentally handicapped children. It was completed in 1995, after she died. The school still stands today, funded with income from the continuing sales of her albums, and is cited as an instance of her pious concern for the less fortunate.

Discography 

Studio albums
 Seberkas Sinar (1989)
 Bintang Kehidupan (1990)
 Nyalakan Api (1990)
 Matahariku (1991)
 Biarlah Aku Mengalah (1992)
 Biarkan Cintamu Berlalu (1994)
 Duri Terlindung (1994; only Malaysian released)
 Sandiwara Cinta (1995)
 Mama Aku Ingin Pulang (1995; posthumous released)
 Suara Hatiku (1996; posthumous released)
 Hanya Satu Nama (2013; posthumous released)

Greatest hits albums
 1991 - Golden Hits: Nike Ardilla
 1991 - 16: The Best of Nike Ardilla
 1992 - 20: The Best of Nike Ardilla
 1993 - The Best of Nike Ardilla: Tinggallah Ku Sendiri
 1995 - 20 Mega Hit Nike Ardilla
 1996 - Best Slow Nike Ardilla Vol. 1
 1997 - Best Slow Nike Ardilla Vol. 2
 1998 - Best of the Best: Nike Ardilla Vol. 1
 1999 - Best of the Best Nike Ardilla Vol. 2
 2002 - Best Beat
 2009 - Koleksi Terlengkap: Nike Ardilla

Single released
 1987 - Lupa Diri
 1988 - Dia Idolaku
 1988 - Antara Hitam Dan Putih 
 1989 - Kelip-kelip Cinta 
 1989 - Cukup Sampai Disini
 1989 - Hati Batu
 1990 - Rona Rona Biru
 1991 - Star of Life / Bintang Kehidupan
 1992 - Warga Kelas Tiga 
 1992 - Cintaku Padamu
 1993 - Cinta Kita
 1993 - Untuk Apalagi
 1993 - Tinggallah Kusendiri
 1994 - Menanti kejujuran (Set Me Free)
 1995 - Anugerah
 1995 - Biarkanlah
 1996 - Selamat Jalan Duka
 1996 - Cinta Di Antara Kita
 1997 - Panggung Sandiwara
 1998 - Ingin Kulupakan
 2000 - Belenggu Cinta 
Single (Soundtrack)
 Nakalnya Anak Muda (1990)
 Lupus (1990)
 Aksara Biru (1991)
 Nuansa Gadis Suci (1992)
 Deru Debu (1994)

Single in Malaysia
 Duri Terlindung (1994)
 Ku Tak Akan Bersuara (1994)
 Pengembara Terasing (1996)
 Suara Hatiku (1996)
 Deru Debu (1995)

Awards
 International
 Gold Prize of New Singer - Asia Song Festival Shanghai 1991
 Anugerah Muzik 1994 — Best Indonesian Selling Album in Malaysia (Duri Terlindung)
 ABU Golden Kite World Song Festival 1994 — Best Performer (Second Runnerup)
 Golden Prize Malaysia Music Awards 2005 — Year's Best Compilation Album
 National
 TVRI Jakarta 1980 — First Champion  
 HAPMI 1985 — First Champion, Pop Singing
 TERUNA Festival Indonesia, 1986 — Third Winner
 3 Genre Singing Festival, West Java, 1987 — First Champion
 Multi-Platinum Award for "Seberkas Sinar", 1989.
 BASF Awards 1990 — Best Selling Album ("Bintang Kehidupan")
 Indonesian Popular Song Festival 1990 — Best Performer
 BASF Awards 1991 — Best Selling Album ("Nyalakan Api")
 Multi-Platinum Award for "Matahariku", 1991.
 BASF Awards 1992 — Best Selling Album ("Biarlah Aku Mengalah")
 Multi-Platinum Award for "Tinggallah Ku Sendiri", 1993.
 HDX Awards 1994 — Best Selling Album ("Biarkan Cintamu Berlalu")
 HDX Awards 1995 — Best Selling Album ("Sandiwara Cinta")
 HDX Awards 1995 — Biggest Omzet Album ("Sandiwara Cinta")
 HDX Awards 1996 — Best Selling Album ("Suara Hatiku")
 Music Mingguan Awards ANteve 1996 — Best Selling Album ("Suara Hatiku")
 HDX Awards 1996 — Best Album ("Deru Debu")
 BASF Awards 1996 — Triple-Platinum Album ("Mama Aku Ingin Pulang")
 Multi-Platinum Award — "Panggung Sandiwara", 1997.
 Multi-Platinum Award — "Cinta Diantara Kita", 1997.
 Multi-Platinum Award — "Ingin Ku Lupakan", 1998.
 Multi-Platinum Award — "Belenggu Cinta", 1999.
 Multi-Platinum Award — "The Best of Volume II", 2000.
 Multi-Platinum Award — "Best Beat", 2002.
 Multi-Platinum Award — "Best of The Best", 2004.
 Multi-Platinum Award — "Golden Memories", 2005.
 Multi-Platinum Award — "11 tahun Nike Ardilla", 2006.
 Multi-Platinum Award — "Lagu Pilihan Fans", 2007.
 Multi-Platinum Award — "Tinggallah Ku Sendiri", 2008.
 Multi-Platinum Award — Number One RBT, 2009.
 Triple-Platinum Award — "Koleksi Lenggkap", 2010.

 Video Music Awards
 Video Musik Indonesia 1993 — Video Favorite of The Month ("Tinggallah Ku Sendiri")
 Video Musik Indonesia 1994 — Video Favorite of The Month ("Biarkan Cintamu Berlalu")
 Video Musik Indonesia 1994 — Video Favorite of The Year ("BIarkan Cintamu Berlalu")
 MTV Viewer Choice Indonesia 1997 — Best Female Video

 Television Awards
 Dunia Bintang SCTV Awards 1995 — Favorite Viewer Artist
 Dunia Bintang SCTV Awards 1995 — Favorite Journalist Artist
 Highest Second Rating, 2003 — Silet Infotainment, "Nike Ardilla Episode"
 SCTV Programme Eko Patrio Show, 2005 — Best Legend (Viewers' Choice)

 Modeling/Magazine/Tabloid/Newspaper
 Sahabat Pena Magazine, 1986 — Cover
 LA Clerk Model Contest, 1989 — Third Winner
 Gadis Sampul 1990 — Favorite
 Monitor Magazine, 1990 — Best Performer on TV
 Citra Magazine, 1992 — Best Actress (Readers' Choice)
 Nyata, 1993 — Most Wanted Actress (Readers' Choice)
 Popular Magazine, 1994 — Most Popular Artist
 URTV Magazine, 1994 — Favorite Cover
 Citra Magazine, 1994 — Most Dedicated and Creative Singer (Indonesian)
 Citra Magazine, 1995 — Best Female Singer (Indonesian)
 PT. POS Indonesia, 1996 — Nike Ardilla Stamp and Post Cards Tribute
 Nova, 2007 — Best Selling Tabloid, "Nike Ardilla Cover", 2007

Concerts in Malaysia and Singapore

 Battle Of The Bands Concert at Stadium Negara, Kuala Lumpur (February 2, 1989)
 Battle Of The Bands concert touring Malaysia (March 1, 1990)
 Ella & The Boys Open Concert at Anniversari Stage, Kuala Lumpur (1 May 1990)
 Nike Ardilla Indra Mulia Stadium Concert, Ipoh, Perak (April 18, 1991)
 Art & Sound Concert, with Ramli Sarip & Lefthanded at Stadium Negara, Singapore (19 January 1992)
 Saleem's Rock Concert, with MAY & BPR at Stadium Negara, Kuala Lumpur (September 8, 1992)
 Let Me Give Up Concert in Kuala Lumpur, Malaysia (January 3, 1993)
 Valentine's Day Concert with Ella and Nike Ardilla at Stadium Negara, Kuala Lumpur (February 14, 1993)
 Nike Ardilla Solo Concert, with Cromok at the Shah Alam Festival Site, Selangor (June 10, 1993)
 Nike Ardilla Solo Concert at the Indoor Stadium, Singapore (October 20, 1993)
 New Year Concert with Zainal Abidin, Ella and Nike Ardilla (January 1, 1994)
 Duri Terlindung Concert touring Malaysia (February 21, 1994)
 Concert for Nike Ardilla touring Malaysia (January 2, 1995)
 DBKL Rock Orchestra Concert in Kuala Lumpur (January 10, 1995)
 Bulldozer concert with rock artists (January 19, 1995)
 Asian Rhythm Festival at the National Stadium, Bukit Jalil, Kuala Lumpur (January 21, 1995)
 Regional Rhythm Concert, with Search & Indonesian artists at Malawati Stadium, Shah Alam, Selangor (February 3, 1995)
 Sunday Nite Live at Planet Hollywood, Kuala Lumpur (February 25, 1995)

Filmography

Film

TV series

References

External links
 
 
 
 Nike Ardilla on Spotify
 Nike Ardilla on YouTube

Video source

1975 births
1995 deaths
Indonesian child actresses
Indonesian child singers
20th-century Indonesian women singers
Indonesian pop singers
Indonesian rock singers
Road incident deaths in Indonesia
Actresses from West Java
Musicians from West Java
Indonesian people of Dutch descent
Indonesian people of German descent
Sundanese people
Indo people